What It Is is a studio album by jazz pianist Jacky Terrasson released on May 18, 1999 by Blue Note label. Terrasson plays on a Steinway piano.

Reception
Phil Gallo of Variety stated, "Terrasson’s fourth album as a leader, “What It Is” on Blue Note, finds the much-heralded French-American pianist tackling soulful numbers and works composed for an assortment of instrumentalists... His adventurousness deserves kudos — but this band’s execution needs work." Scott Yanow of AllMusic wrote, "This set is a bit of a departure for pianist Jacky Terrasson who has generally been heard in acoustic trio formats... Overall, this set is open to the influences of world music and more funk-oriented jazz, yet Jacky Terrasson still sounds quite creative, explorative and individual. An intriguing program." Geoffrey Himes of The Washington Post added, "the Parisian pianist has often been a prisoner of his own virtuosity, compelled to prove how many notes he could play in a chorus rather than how much emotion. By concentrating on more obvious melodies and by experimenting with different arrangements, Terrasson has broken out of that prison and expressed himself as never before."

Track listing

Personnel
Jacky Terrasson – acoustic piano
Rick Centalonza – flute, oboe
Adam Rogers – guitar
Fernando Saunders – electric bass
Mino Cinelu – drums, percussion
Ugonna Okegwo – acoustic bass
Jaz Sawyer – drums
Richard Bona – electric bass
Jay Collins – flute 
Gregoire Maret – harmonica 
Michael Brecker – tenor saxophone
Xiomara Laugarts – vocals

References

1999 albums
Jacky Terrasson albums
Blue Note Records albums